Brilant Hasaj (born 5 June 1996) is an Albanian professional footballer who plays as a centre-forward for the Kategoria e Parë club Burreli.

References

External links

1996 births
Living people
People from Shkodër County
Sportspeople from Shkodër
Footballers from Shkodër
Albanian footballers
Association football forwards
KS Ada Velipojë players
KF Vllaznia Shkodër players
KS Veleçiku Koplik players
KF Laçi players
KS Burreli players
Kategoria Superiore players
Kategoria e Parë players
Kategoria e Dytë players